The USS San Francisco Memorial is a war memorial installed in San Francisco's Lands End, in the U.S. state of California. The memorial has a plaque commemorating the approximately 100 sailors and seven Marines who died aboard the cruiser . The memorial is notable for being formed partially from the bridge of ship itself, showing some of the extensive damage received in battle.

References

External links

 

Buildings and structures in San Francisco
Military monuments and memorials in the United States
Monuments and memorials in California